The Hugo Award for Best Novella is one of the Hugo Awards given each year for science fiction or fantasy stories published or translated into English during the previous calendar year. The novella award is available for works of fiction of between 17,500 and 40,000 words; awards are also given out in the short story, novelette and novel categories. The Hugo Awards have been described as "a fine showcase for speculative fiction" and "the best known literary award for science fiction writing".

The Hugo Award for Best Novella has been awarded annually since 1968. In addition to the regular Hugo awards, beginning in 1996 Retrospective Hugo Awards, or "Retro Hugos", have been available to be awarded for years 50, 75, or 100 years prior in which no awards were given.  Retro Hugos may only be awarded for years after 1939 in which no awards were originally given. To date, Retro Hugo awards have been given for novellas for 1939, 1941, 1943–1946, 1951, and 1954.

During the 63 nomination years, 183 authors have had works nominated; 47 of these have won, including coauthors and Retro Hugos. Connie Willis has received the most Hugos for Best Novella at four, and is tied for the most nominations with Robert Silverberg at eight. Willis and Charles Stross at three out of four nominations, and Robert A. Heinlein at three out of six nominations for Retro Hugos, are the only authors to have won more than twice. Nancy Kress has earned seven nominations and Heinlein, George R. R. Martin, Seanan McGuire, Kim Stanley Robinson, and Lucius Shepard six, and are the only authors besides Willis and Silverberg to get more than five. Robinson has the highest number of nominations without winning.

Selection
Hugo Award nominees and winners are chosen by the supporting and attending members of the annual World Science Fiction Convention, or Worldcon, and the presentation evening constitutes its central event. The selection process is defined in the World Science Fiction Society Constitution as instant-runoff voting with six nominees, except in the case of a tie. These novellas on the ballot are the six most-nominated by members that year, with no limit on the number of stories that can be nominated. Initial nominations are made by members in January through March, while voting on the ballot of six nominations is performed roughly in April through July, subject to change depending on when that year's Worldcon is held.  Prior to 2017, the final ballot was five works; it was changed that year to six, with each initial nominator limited to five nominations. Worldcons are generally held near the start of September, and are held in a different city around the world each year. Members are permitted to vote "no award", if they feel that none of the nominees is deserving of the award that year, and in the case that "no award" takes the majority the Hugo is not given in that category. This happened in the Best Novella category in 2015.

Winners and nominees 
In the following table, the years correspond to the date of the ceremony, rather than when the novella was first published. Each year links to the corresponding "year in literature". Entries with a blue background have won the award; those with a white background are the nominees on the short-list. If the novella was originally published in a book with other stories rather than by itself or in a magazine, the book title is included after the publisher's name.

  *   Winners and joint winners
  +   No winner selected

Retro Hugos 
Beginning with the 1996 Worldcon, the World Science Fiction Society created the concept of "Retro Hugos", in which the Hugo award could be retroactively awarded for years 50, 75, or 100 years before the current year, if no awards were originally given that year. Retro Hugos have been awarded eight times, for 1939, 1941, 1943–1946, 1951, and 1954.

See also
 Nebula Award for Best Novella

Notes

References

External links
 Hugo Award official website
 List of Hugo Award nominees in Locus magazine

Novella
Novella awards